ČEZ Group ( České Energetické Závody) is a conglomerate of 96 companies (including the parent company ČEZ, a.s.), 72 of them in the Czech Republic. Its  core business is the generation, distribution, trade in, and sales of electricity and heat, trade in and sales of natural gas, and coal extraction. ČEZ Group operates also in Bulgaria, Germany, Hungary, Poland, Romania, Slovakia and Turkey. ČEZ, a.s. is listed on Prague Stock Exchange and Warsaw Stock Exchange.

ČEZ is the largest utility and biggest public company in Central and Eastern Europe. Its majority shareholder is the Czech government, owning 70% of shares. Its historical political activities have come under scrutiny. According to the Economist, "though nominally state-run, many see the power flowing the other way: from CEZ’s board into politics". Capital Group Companies invested 2.98% into ČEZ Group. Since 2011, when Daniel Beneš have become CEO these calls faded out.

As of late 2010 the EU was investigating the company's activities. Comments made by third parties under the market test have shown no need to materially change the commitments proposed by ČEZ to the European Commission in June 2012. Under the Settlement Agreement, ČEZ undertakes to sell one of five specific power plants with an installed capacity of at least 800 MW.

In January 2013 Albania started a dispute by removing CEZ license to operate in Albania. In June 2014 both parties agreed to settle a dispute. Albania will pay CEZ 100 million euros by 2018 in yearly installments, an amount roughly equal to CEZ's initial investment.

In February 2013 Bulgarians began to mass protests against the company and two other foreign-owned power distributors, suggesting the government to follow the case of Albania. All three were fined by Bulgarian competition watchdog. However ČEZ said it had not breached Bulgarian and European laws and would launch an appeal against the ruling in court.

Under CEO Daniel Beneš (since 2011) CEZ Group presented and implemented its new strategy based on three pillars: I. Be among the best in the operation of conventional power facilities and proactively respond to the challenges of the 21st century. II. Offer customers a wide range of products and services addressing their energy needs. III. Strengthen and consolidate ČEZ's position in Central Europe.

In 2015, ČEZ scored first in Deloitte CEE Top 500 according to market cap and forth in overall ranking  and was elected overall winner of the 2015 Euromoney Best Managed Companies Survey for Central and Eastern Europe.

Power stations 

ČEZ Group is an operator of various energy sources. Most important energy sources are listed (in the Czech Republic, if not indicated):
nuclear power plants
Temelín (2000 MW - 2 * 1086)
Dukovany (2000 MW - 4 * 510)
coal-fired power plants
Dětmarovice Power Station (800 MW - 4 * 200)
Hodonín Power Station (105 MW - 50 + 55) (world's third largest power plant fired by biomass List of largest power stations in the world)
Chvaletice Power Station (800 MW - 4 * 200)
Ledvice Power Station (330 MW - 3 * 110)
Mělník Power Station (770 MW - 2 * 110 + 500)
Počerady Power Station (1,000 MW - 5 * 200)
Poříčí Power Station (165 MW - 3 * 55)
Prunéřov Power Station (1,490 MW - 4 * 110 + 5 * 210)
Tisová Power Station (295 MW - 3 * 57 + 125 + 13)
Tušimice Power Station (800 MW - 4 * 200)
Elcho Power Station (Poland, 220 MW - 2 * 110)
Skawina Power Station (Poland, 492 MW)
hydroelectric power station
Lipno (122 MW)
Orlík (364 MW)
Kamýk (40 MW)
Slapy (144 MW)
Štěchovice (23 MW)
Vrané (14 MW)
Střekov (20 MW)
pumped storage plants
Dalešice (450 MW)
Dlouhé stráně (650 MW)
Štěchovice (45 MW)
In 2015 CEZ operated 2,3 GW of hydro power plants in Europe and Asia, including the biggest pump storages.
wind power plants
Fântânele Wind Farm (Romania, 600 MW, the largest wind farm in Europe
solar power plants
Mimoň Solar Park (18 MW)
Ralsko Solar Park (38 MW)
Ševětín Solar Park (30 MW)
Vranovská Ves Solar Park (16 MW)
other smaller energy sources

Carbon intensity 
ČEZ Group has invested more than CZK 200bn in development and in environmental measures during its modern history to increase efficiency and reduce emission of its power plants. Today, the ČEZ brand represents energy producers or suppliers in a total of 7 countries.

Source: Annual Reports

Electricity capacity and production 

Source:Helgi Library;
Presentation for investors - August 2015 

Source:Helgi Library;
Presentation for investors - August 2015

Shareholders and stock listing 
In 1994 a minor stake in the company was privatized using voucher privatization. If citizens invested all their vouchers (sold for 1000,- Kčs) in ČEZ, they gained 33 stocks (330 current shares after stock split). In 2007 the Czech government decided to gradually sell another 7% stake of ČEZ on the stock market, but due to the stock price fall during spring 2009, affected by financial crisis, selling was suspended. In 2008 the company decided to repurchase 9% of the company's shares.

As of December 31, 2011, the Czech Republic represented by Ministry of Finance remained the company's largest shareholder with 69.78% stake in the stated capital.
Other shareholders included:
 Chase Nominees Ltd. (4.83%)
 Citibank Europe plc (4.8%)
 Private individuals (4.31%)
 Československá obchodní banka (4.17%)

The company is traded on the Prague, Warsaw, Frankfurt and RM-SYSTÉM Czech stock exchanges. and since 2001 company is paying annual dividends.

Electric vehicles 
The building of a network of public charging stations for electric vehicles got fully underway in 2011. The first public charging station – in front of ČEZ's headquarters in Prague's Duhová Street – opened on November 30, 2011. As of December 2011, seven CEZ Group public charging stations were in operation, in Prague and Chrášťany, Prague-West district.
ČEZ's given charities electric cars to use and test. Between 50 and 100 electric cars being made available over the coming years. The first two vehicles – a Fiat Fiorino Combi and a Fiat Fiorino Cargo – went to a senior citizen health care charity based in Prague.

Influence on politics
ČEZ is the largest utility and biggest public company in Central and Eastern Europe. Its influence on the Czech politics and connections to Russia have come under scrutiny. According to the Economist, "though nominally state-run, many see the power flowing the other way: from  ČEZ’s board into politics".

The management of ČEZ has financed the country's largest political parties – the Civic Democratic Party (ODS) and the Social Democrats (ČSSD). One analysis points out that the financing has resembled that coming from PPF and J&T, two firms which have been highly active in Russia since the early 1990s (for example, Russia was one of the first international expansion destinations of Home Credit, a PPF-owned lending company) and their senior management is known to have links to the former Czechoslovak StB security service and the Soviet KGB.

A Czech court recently ruled that, as a state-owned company, ČEZ must disclose political activities.

Leaked pictures show politicians across political spectrum, including former Prime Minister Mirek Topolánek, holidaying with ČEZ lobbyists in Italy.

As of late 2010 the European Union was investigating ČEZ. The company's offices were raided in November 2010.

ČEZ was said to have selected a mysterious company called CEEI to construct a billion dollar nuclear storage facility for the Czech Republic. The company's paper trace ends in U.B.I.E, a company registered in Liechtenstein. Russia's honorary consul is named as its director. The company is believed to be under Russian control.
CEEI's directors include Václav Klaus's former chief of staff (Jiří Kovář) and a man who is jail for kidnapping.

Since 2011, after Daniel Beneš became CEO calls about political influence have faded out. In 2014, ČEZ Group presented its new strategy based on three pillars: I. Be among the best in the operation of conventional power facilities and proactively respond to the challenges of the 21st century. II. Offer customers a wide range of products and services addressing their energy needs. III. Strengthen and consolidate ČEZ's position in Central Europe. In 2015, ČEZ scored first in Deloitte CEE Top 500 according to market cap and forth in overall ranking.

See also

 Energy in the Czech Republic

References

External links

 ČEZ Group website 
 ČEZ Group Report

Companies based in Prague
Energy companies established in 1992
Companies listed on the Warsaw Stock Exchange
Electric power companies of the Czech Republic
Nuclear power companies of the Czech Republic
1992 establishments in Czechoslovakia